RBN may refer to:

 Rajah Broadcasting Network, a television and radio network in the Philippines
 Rejoice Broadcast Network, a Christian network in Pensacola, Florida
 Reliance Broadcast Network, India
 Republic Broadcasting Network, a satellite, shortwave, and Internet radio operation in Texas
 Rock Band Network, a downloadable content service
 Russian Business Network, a Russian ISP openly engaged in criminal activities
 Random boolean network, a model in statistical physics where the nodes of graph carry a Boolean value
 Royal Brunei Navy, and also the associated prefix for ships of the navy